Henri Hébrant (born 10 February 1904, date of death unknown) was a Belgian boxer. He competed in the men's bantamweight event at the 1920 Summer Olympics.

References

1904 births
Year of death missing
Belgian male boxers
Olympic boxers of Belgium
Boxers at the 1920 Summer Olympics
Sportspeople from Liège
Bantamweight boxers